The 2019–20 Texas State Bobcats women's basketball team represented Texas State University in the 2019–20 NCAA Division I women's basketball season. The Bobcats, led by eight year head coach Zenarae Antoine, played their home games at Strahan Coliseum and were members of the Sun Belt Conference. They finished the season 13–17, 6–12 in Sun Belt play to finish in tenth place. They lost in the first round of the Sun Belt women's tournament to UT Arlington 50-74. Shortly after being eliminated, the Sun Belt cancelled the remainder of the season, which was followed by the NCAA cancelling all post-season play due to the COVID-19 pandemic

Preseason

Sun Belt coaches poll
On October 30, 2019, the Sun Belt released their preseason coaches poll with the Bobcats predicted to finish in ninth place in the conference.

Sun Belt Preseason All-Conference team
No members of the team were chosen to the preseason team

Roster

Schedule

|-
!colspan=9 style=| Non-conference regular season

|-
!colspan=9 style=| Sun Belt regular season

|-
!colspan=9 style=| Sun Belt Women's Tournament

See also
 2019–20 Texas State Bobcats men's basketball team

References

Texas State
Texas State Bobcats women's basketball seasons